The William Carlos Williams Award is given out by the Poetry Society of America for a poetry book published by a small press, non-profit, or university press. 

The award is endowed by the family and friends of Geraldine Clinton Little, a poet and author of short stories and former vice-president of the society.
The award is a "purchase prize" of $500 to $1000.

Winners
 2018 Jennifer Chang, Some Say the Lark, Judge: Paisley Rekdal
 2017 Monica Youn, Blackacre, Judge: Robin Coste Lewis
 2016 Brandon Shimoda, Evening Oracle, Judge: Katie Peterson 
 2015 Jennifer Moxley, The Open Secret, Judge: Ange Mlinko
 2014 Ron Padgett, Collected Poems, Judge: Thomas Lux
 2013 Naomi Replansky, Collected Poems, Judge: B. H. Fairchild 
 2012 Bruce Smith, Devotions, Judge: Elizabeth Macklin
 2011 Mary Ruefle, Selected Poems, Judge: Rodney Jones
 2010 Eleanor Ross Taylor, Captive Voices, Judge: Lynn Emanuel
 2009 Linda Gregg, All of It Singing: New and Selected Poems, Judge: James Longenbach 
 2008 Aram Saroyan, Complete Minimal Poems, Judge: Ron Silliman
 2007 Matthew Zapruder, The Pajamaist, Judge: Tony Hoagland 
 2006 Brenda Hillman, Pieces of Air in the Epic, Judge: Marjorie Welish
 2004 Anthony Butts, Little Low Heaven, Judge: Lucie Brock-Broido
 2003 Gary Young, No Other Life, Judge: Angela Jackson
 2002 Li-Young Lee, Book of My Nights (American Poets Continuum), Judge: Carolyn Kizer
 2001 Ralph J. Mills, Grasses Standing: Selected Poems, Judge: Fanny Howe
 2000 Kathleen Peirce, The Oval Hour Judge: Jean Valentine
 1999 B.H. Fairchild, The Art of the Lathe, Judge: Garrett Hongo
 1998 John Balaban, Locusts at the Edge of Summer: New and Selected Poems, Judge: Robert Phillips
 1995 Cyrus Cassells, Soul Make a Path Through Shouting
 1994 David Ray, Wool Highways
 1992 Louise Glück, The Wild Iris
 1990 Safiya Henderson-Holmes, Madness and a Bit of Hope 
 1989 Diane Wakoski, Emerald Ice: Selected Poems 1962-1987 
 1987 Alan Shapiro, Happy Hour
 1980 Robert Hass, Praise
 1979 David Ray, The Tramp's Cup
 1978 David Lincoln Fisher, Teachings

References

See also
American poetry
List of poetry awards
List of literary awards
List of years in poetry
List of years in literature

American poetry awards